Europa String Choir is a cross-disciplinary musical ensemble formed in 1991. Its core members are Cathy Stevens (6-string electric viola) and Udo Dzierzanowski (guitar, bouzouki) although the project can also compose, perform and record as a trio and as a quartet. Other ESC members during the ensemble's lifetime have been Alessandro Bruno (guitar), Markus Reuter (Warr Guitar, touch guitar) and Susan Nares (Celtic harp, cello).

History

Cathy Stevens grew up in a musical family (she is the daughter of composer Bernard Stevens) and studied violin and viola at the Yehudi Menuhin School and the Royal Academy of Music. In 1975, she became a professional orchestral player, working with the London Sinfonietta and Fires of London among others. Between 1983 and 1992, Stevens worked as one half of the improvised music duo Pool of Sound (with cellist Chas Dickie, a former member of Van der Graaf Generator and a veteran of the improvised music scene).

By 1982, Stevens had also graduated as a practitioner of the Alexander Technique, and it was in this capacity that she began working with Robert Fripp's Guitar Craft courses in 1989. On one of these courses she met guitarist Udo Dzierzanowski. In 1991 Stevens and Dzierzanowski formed a viola-and-guitar duo called The Annexe performing both self-penned and classical music, which toured with fellow Guitar Craft graduates California Guitar Trio.

On a subsequent residential music course in 1993, second guitarist Alessandro Bruno joined the project, which took on  the new name of Europa String Choir. The ensemble's first album, The Starving Moon, was recorded for Fripp's Discipline Global Mobile label later in the same year. In 1996, Europa String Choir recruited a fourth member - Chapman Stick/Warr Guitar player Markus Reuter, another Guitar Craft student.

Over the next four years, the quartet would intermittently tour Europe and the USA. Europa String Choir's second album Lemon Crash was released by DGM spinoff label DGMLive. A more composed and pre-structured work, reflecting the ensemble's classical leanings, it was produced by David Bottrill. Marching Ants, a second album of improvisations from the Lemon Crash sessions and tour was eventually released in 2003 on the Burning Shed label.

During the next decade, Europa String Choir continued to record and perform intermittently, predominantly as a duo of Stevens and Dzierzanowski. Celtic harp player/cellist Susan Nares (from the Poole-based Soundways project) was recruited for the ensemble's trio lineup in 2003.

In 2013, Stevens and Dzierzanowski relocated the Europa String Choir from south-west England to a location near the Alps on the German/Austrian border. In 2014 the ensemble released their first album in eleven years (the ambient/improvised recording Eye of the Beholder). In November 2014, they announced that Austrian bodhran player Wolfgang Maier would be the new third member of the performing trio.

Other musical activities

Both Stevens and Dzierzanowski are also members of contemporary improvised music ensemble ZAUM (now 2AUM), founded by the late improv/power drummer Steve Harris in 2001  and collaborate with visual artist Frances Hatch (as Frozen Orchestras of Lost Sound).

Personnel

Current members

Cathy Stevens (violin, viola, Violectra) 
Udo Dzierzanowski (guitar, bouzouki)

Previous/additional members

Alessandro Bruno (guitar) 
Markus Reuter (Warr Guitar, touch guitar) 
Susan Nares (Celtic harp, cello)
Wolfgang Maier (bodhran)

Discography

The Starving Moon (Discipline Global Mobile, 1995)
Lemon Crash (DGMLive, 2000)
Marching Ants (Burning Shed, 2004)
The Eye of the Beholder (self-released, 2014)

External links
Europa String Choir homepage

References

Contemporary classical music ensembles
Chamber music groups
Crossover (music)
Musical groups established in 1993